The Hurricane Heights are the irregular, mainly ice-free heights which rise to about  at the south side of the head of Towle Valley, in the Convoy Range of Victoria Land, Antarctica. The name was applied by a 1989–90 New Zealand Antarctic Research Programme field party to describe the windy aspect of this upland area.

References

Mountains of Victoria Land
Scott Coast